Opo Public Stadium is a small stadium in Gwangju, Gyeonggi-do, South Korea.  It is currently used mostly for amateur football matches and other activities. The stadium has a capacity of only a few hundred people.

Other stadia in Gwangju, Gyeonggi-do, South Korea
Gwangju City Public Stadium, Silchon Public Stadium and Toichon Public Stadium are also located in Gwangju, Gyeonggi-do, South Korea.

 

Sports venues in South Korea
Football venues in South Korea
Sports venues in Gyeonggi Province